Frederick Mortimer "Cap" Irish (May 16, 1870 – April 12, 1941) was an American football coach, college athletics administrator, and science instructor. He served as the first head football coach at the Territorial Normal School, renamed Tempe Normal School in 1903 and now known as Arizona State University, coaching from 1897 to 1906 and compiling a record of 12–8. Territorial Normal did not field a football team in 1898 or 1901. Irish was also the first athletic director at Territorial/Tempe Normal, serving from 1896 to 1913. In addition, he taught science at the school. Irish Field one of the original homes of Arizona State Football was also named after the coach and administrator.

Irish graduated from the University of Iowa in 1895 with a Bachelor of Science degree. He taught in his hometown of Dubuque, Iowa, before moving to Arizona. 

Irish died at a hospital in Tempe, Arizona, on April 12, 1941. Irish Hall, a residence hall at Arizona State University, is named for him.

Head coaching record

References

External links
 

1870 births
1941 deaths
19th-century American educators
20th-century American educators
Arizona State Sun Devils athletic directors
Arizona State Sun Devils football coaches
Arizona State University faculty
University of Iowa alumni
Sportspeople from Dubuque, Iowa
Coaches of American football from Iowa